The Church of the Good Shepherd, located at 4967 Broadway at the corner of Isham Street in the Inwood neighborhood of Manhattan, New York City, is a Roman Catholic parish church of the Roman Catholic Archdiocese of New York.  It was built in 1935-36 and was designed by Paul Monaghan in the Romanesque Revival style.  The Celtic cross at the top of the church is an indication that the parish was originally largely Irish-American; today there are more Dominican-Americans than Irish.

History
The parish was established in 1911 on land purchased by the Paulist Fathers from the Isham Estate. It is currently staffed by the Capuchin Friars. At the time of its founding, Inwood was considered to be "the unofficial capital of the Irish diaspora", and the parish was largely made up of Irish-Americans. The parish's first church was built c.1912, to designs by Thomas H. Poole & Company, on a site just down Isham Street from the current church, surrounded by wooded countryside.

A two-story parochial school at 110-116 Cooper Street was built in 1924, to designs by Auguste L. Noel, at the cost of $250,000. A five-story brick convent was located at 620 Isham Street; it was built in 1950 and was designed by architect Paul C. Reilly.  It cost $300,000 to construct.

Despite the change of the parish's ethnic make-up to be largely Dominican-Americans, there are still ties to the church and New York's Irish community.  The church was deeply affected by the loss of many Irish-Americans in the September 11 attacks.  As a memorial, a twisted cruciform piece of steel from the World Trade Center stands in the churchyard, with a sign saying "Ground Hero".

References 
Notes

External links

Dominican-American culture in New York (state)
Irish-American culture in New York City
Roman Catholic churches completed in 1936
Romanesque Revival church buildings in New York City
Roman Catholic churches in Manhattan
Inwood, Manhattan
Broadway (Manhattan)
20th-century Roman Catholic church buildings in the United States